Koneti Raju Palem is a small village to become municipality before 2027 in the Nellore district of Andhra Pradesh, India.

Villages in Nellore district